Cefluprenam is a fourth generation cephalosporin. It was patented in 2008 by now defunct Cubist Pharmaceuticals. A 1997 clinical trial illustrated that Cefluprenam is highly effective against bacterial pneumonia.

References

Cephalosporin antibiotics
Thiadiazoles
Quaternary ammonium compounds
Acetamides
Organofluorides